Nepalese Australians or Nepali Australians are the Citizens/Permanent Residents in Australia whose ethnic origins lie fully or partially in Nepal. Nepalese started to settle in Australia from the 1960s.

Lhotshampa refugees
About 5,000 Lhotshampas or Bhutanese refugees who are living in various refugee camps of Nepal are being resettled in Australia. They share common language and culture with the mainstream Nepali.

Since 1990, ethnic Nepalis in more than 110,000 in numbers, who were forced out of Bhutan have temporarily settled in refugee camps in eastern part of Nepal. After the 15 years of exile they are now being resettled in Australia, US and Europe. By the end of the resettlement program it is estimated that around 5,000 of Bhutanese will be in Australia.

International students
The number of Nepalese students seeking admission to universities in Australia is increasing. The instability caused by the Maoist insurgency and Gorkha earthquake of 2015, has led Nepalese students to turn to Australia for academic pursuits. The figures from the federal Government’s Australian Education International (AEI) in 2007 show that in the 12 months to September, commencements by students from Nepal increased by 504 per cent, or 2884 students.

Notable Nepalese Australians
 Dichen Lachman, actress
 Payal Shakya, former Miss Nepal
 Sanu Sharma, writer
 Shesh Ghale, businessman
 Jamuna Gurung, businesswoman

See also

 List of Nepal-related topics
 Non Resident Nepali
 Nepalese New Zealanders
 Australia–Nepal relations

References

External links
 Nepalese Australian Association
 Nepalese Australian Online News Portal

 
Australia
Immigration to Australia
Asian Australian